Fear Over the City (French: Peur sur la ville) is a 1975 French crime film directed by Henri Verneuil and starring Jean-Paul Belmondo. It was the first time Belmondo played a police officer.

It was released in the United States and the United Kingdom as  The Night Caller.

Plot
Policeman Jean Letellier is under pressure, because the infamous gangster Marcucci escaped from him publicly. Moreover, during the pursuit an innocent bystander was killed by a stray bullet. Letellier is investigated for having fired the deadly bullet.

Before Letellier is cleared, a serial killer begins to murder young women, each time leaving a weird message at the site of crime. He calls himself "Minos", referring to the Divine Comedy. The murderer always declares he had punished his victims for what he considers their impure life style.

While Letellier still has no trace of Minos, he comes across Marcucci's current whereabouts. Just as before, Marcucci tries to escape in a spectacular manner when Letellier confronts him. But this time Marcucci dies in the course of action.

Marcucci's death is no relief for Letellier who is now publicly accused of having neglected the Minos case in favour of settling his personal feud with his late archenemy.

Minos keeps on murdering and leaving provoking hints until Letellier can identify him. The serial killer can only scarcely elude Letellier, who chases him over the roofs of Paris. His next coup is to take hostages in a skyscraper. Letellier decides he has had it and goes airborne. From a flying helicopter he jumps through the window into the flat and puts Minos down.

Cast
 Jean-Paul Belmondo as Jean Letellier
 Charles Denner as Charles Moissac
 Giovanni Cianfriglia as Marcucci
 Adalberto Maria Merli as Minos
 Jean Martin as Inspector Sabin
 Lea Massari as Norah Elmer
 Rosy Varte as Germaine Doizon
  as Hélène Grammont
 Jean-François Balmer as Julien Dallas
 Albert Delpy as Henri Vernellic

Reception
The film was the second most popular film at the French box office in 1975, after The Towering Inferno. It was Belmondo's most popular movie since Le Casse (1972). It was also popular in Italy and Germany.

It was released in the USA and the UK as The Night Caller.

The New York Times said "it seems to be two completely different movies, neither of them up to much." The Los Angeles Times thought the action sequences "keep an otherwise routine film entertaining." Time Out said Belmondo is "piling stunt on daredevil stunt and risking his neck for a particularly silly story", and "desperately little of the film's energy" goes into the plot.

External links
 
 
Fear Over the City at Le Film Guide

References

1975 films
1970s French-language films
1970s crime action films
French crime action films
Police detective films
Films directed by Henri Verneuil
Films scored by Ennio Morricone
1970s French films
Films with screenplays by Francis Veber